Reinhold Friedrich (born 14 July 1958) is a German trumpeter and university lecturer in Karlsruhe.

Career 
Born in Weingarten, Friedrich was from 1983 to 1999 Solo trumpeter at the Radio-Sinfonie-Orchester Frankfurt. In 1986 he was awarded a prize at the ARD International Music Competition in Munich. Since 1989 he has been professor for trumpet at the Hochschule für Musik Karlsruhe. As a peculiarity, Friedrich masters the playing on the keyed trumpet of which he presented various recordings. Friedrich also cultivates the playing of historical baroque trumpet and teaches trumpet playing in the sense of the historically informed performance.

External links 
 
 Homepage der Musikhochschule Karlsruhe – Dozent Reinhold Friedrich
 Homepage von Reinhold Friedrich
 Interview mit dem Schweizer Klassikportal Classicpoint.ch
 Reinhold Friedrich playing Haydn 3rd movement (rehearsal) (YouTube)

1958 births
Living people
People from Baden
German classical trumpeters
Male trumpeters
20th-century German musicians
21st-century German musicians
Academic staff of the Hochschule für Musik Karlsruhe
21st-century trumpeters
20th-century German male musicians
21st-century German male musicians